Hilairy Ellen Hartnett is professor at Arizona State University known for her work on biogeochemical processes in modern and paleo-environments.

Education and career 
Hartnett has an A.B. from Vassar College (1990) and an M.S. from the University of Washington (1995). She earned her Ph.D. from the University of Washington in 1998. Following her Ph.D. she did postdoctoral work at Rutgers University. She joined Arizona State University in 2003 and, as of 2022, is a professor at Arizona State University.

Research 
Hartnett's early research examined the impact of oxygen on preservation of organic carbon in sediments and how regions of the ocean with low levels of oxygen impact the degradation of organic carbon. She established high-resolution profiles of nitrogen in sediments and examined the consumption of organic matter as a postdoctoral researcher in Sybil P. Seitzinger's lab. More recently she has investigated how organic carbon changes as it is moved along in rivers, especially in the Colorado River the reaction mechanisms of chemical reactions under hydrothermal conditions, and how wind-powered pumps could recover ice in the Arctic. In the realm of astrobiology, Hartnett has spoken about the possibility of life on other planets, how building blocks of life are formed, and about the possibility that the earliest forms of life were purple.

In 2022, Hartnett was involved in the Mayflower AI sea drone project that is sending an autonomous vehicle across the Atlantic Ocean and will collect scientific data which will provide a detailed assessment of the state of the surface ocean.

Hartnett's has an h-index of 26, with eight papers receiving more than 100 citations. Her most highly-cited paper introducing the concept of oxygen exposure time received the 2022 John H. Martin Award from the Association for the Sciences of Limnology and Oceanography.

Selected publications

Awards and honors 
In 2009 Hartnett received a National Science Foundation CAREER Awards. In 2022, Hartnett received the John H. Martin Award from the Association for the Sciences of Limnology and Oceanography for her paper that introduced the concept of oxygen exposure time.

References

External links 

University of Washington alumni
Arizona State University faculty
Living people
Women oceanographers
Women chemists
Year of birth missing (living people)